Mélanie Engoang Nguema (born July 25, 1968) is a Gabonese judoka (3rd dan) and coach, who played for the half-heavyweight category. She is a five-time medalist (two golds and three silver) for her division at the African Judo Championships, and gold medalist at the 1999 All-Africa Games in Johannesburg, South Africa. She also competed at four Summer Olympic games (1992 in Barcelona, 1996 in Atlanta, 2000 in Sydney, and, 2004 in Athens), but she neither reached the final round, nor claimed an Olympic medal. For being the most experienced member at the Olympics, Engoang was the nation's three-time flag bearer at the opening ceremonies.

References

External links
 

Gabonese female judoka
Living people
Olympic judoka of Gabon
Judoka at the 1992 Summer Olympics
Judoka at the 1996 Summer Olympics
Judoka at the 2000 Summer Olympics
Judoka at the 2004 Summer Olympics
1968 births
African Games medalists in judo
African Games gold medalists for Gabon
Competitors at the 1999 All-Africa Games
21st-century Gabonese people
Competitors at the 1995 All-Africa Games
Judoka trainers
Gabonese sports coaches